Lukáš Ondrek (born 11 January 1993) is a Slovak football defender who currently plays for Tatran Oravské Veselé.

MFK Ružomberok
He made his Fortuna Liga debut for Ružomberok against Senica on 21 May 2011.

References

External links
Futbalnet profile 
MFK Ružomberok profile 

Lukáš Ondrek at Footballdatabase

1993 births
Living people
Slovak footballers
Slovakia youth international footballers
Slovakia under-21 international footballers
Association football defenders
MFK Ružomberok players
MFK Tatran Liptovský Mikuláš players
MŠK Rimavská Sobota players
TJ Tatran Oravské Veselé players
Slovak Super Liga players
2. Liga (Slovakia) players
3. Liga (Slovakia) players
Place of birth missing (living people)